TerraScale may refer to:

Intel Tera-Scale
AMD TeraScale (microarchitecture)
TerraScale (company), a green data centre company.